Bettina Stephanie Walter (born February 13, 1971) is a German documentary film producer.

Her works as producer include
The Forum (German: Das Forum, winner of the 2020 German Business Film Prize (de)),
Falciani's Tax Bomb (nominated for the 2015 German Film Award for Best Documentary Film
and the Grimme Online Award for Best Documentary),
Google and the World Brain
(official selection in the Sundance World Cinema competition),
and The Light Bulb Conspiracy (es) (winner of the 2011 Ondas Award for International Television).

Education and Career 

Walter graduated with a master's degree in anthropology, politics, romance languages and Latin American studies from the University of Hamburg.

Since 2000, Walter has taught documentary filmmaking, project development and international co-production for several educational institutions including the Autonomous University of Barcelona, the University of Barcelona, the International University of Catalunya, the Film Academy Baden-Württemberg
and ECIB Film School of Barcelona.

In 2016, the Goethe-Institut and Documentary Campus in collaboration with Walter and BWP founded Campus Latino, a non-profit training programme for filmmakers from Latin America, Spain, Italy and Portugal. The program focusses on creative development, assists in finding financial partners, and explores "innovative distribution strategies" for the international marketplace.

Her works as coproducer include Theatre of War (Spanish: Teatro de Guerra, winner of the CICAE Award at the Berlin International Film Festival), and Mañana al Mar (winner of the 2006 Prix Europa for Non-Fiction).

Filmography

References 

1971 births
Living people
People from Harburg (district)
University of Hamburg alumni
German documentary film producers
German women film producers
German women film directors
21st-century German women
20th-century German women